Arab Colombians refers to Arab immigrants and their descendants in the Republic of Colombia. Most of the migrants came from Lebanon, Jordan, Syria and Palestine. When they were first processed in the ports of Colombia, they were classified as Turks because what is now Lebanon, Syria, Jordan and Palestine were then territories of the  Ottoman Empire. It is estimated that Colombia has a Lebanese population of 3.2 million.  Meanwhile the Palestine population is estimated between 100,000-120,000.

Most of the Syrian-Lebanese established  themselves in the Caribbean Region of Colombia in the towns of Maicao, Riohacha, Santa Marta, Lorica, Fundación, Aracataca, Ayapel, Calamar, Ciénaga, Cereté, Montería and Barranquilla near the basin of the Magdalena River. They later expanded to other cities and by 1945 there were Arab Middle Easterners moving inland like Ocaña, Cúcuta, Barrancabermeja, Ibagué, Girardot, Honda, Tunja, Villavicencio, Pereira, Soatá, Neiva, Buga, Chaparral and Chinácota. The five major hubs of Arab Middle Eastern population were present in Maicao, Barranquilla, Cartagena, Bogotá and Cali. Most arrived as members of the Eastern Orthodox and Eastern Catholic churches, but the majority became Roman Catholic. The number of immigrants entering the country vary from 40,000 to 50,000 in 1945. Most of these immigrants were Christians and others were Muslims.

Many Arabs adapted their names and surnames to the Spanish language as a way to adapt more quickly in the communities where they arrived. For example, people of Arab origin adapted surnames such as Guerra (originally Harb), Domínguez (Ñeca), Durán (Doura), Lara (Larach), Cristo (Salibe) among other surnames.

See also
Arab diaspora
Lebanese Colombians
Lebanese diaspora
Palestinian Colombian
Palestinian diaspora
Race and ethnicity in Colombia
White Colombians

References

 
Ethnic groups in Colombia
 
Arab diaspora in South America
Asian Colombian